Year 148 (CXLVIII) was a leap year starting on Sunday (link will display the full calendar) of the Julian calendar. At the time, it was known as the Year of the Consulship of Cornelius and Calpernius (or, less frequently, year 901 Ab urbe condita). The denomination 148 for this year has been used since the early medieval period, when the Anno Domini calendar era became the prevalent method in Europe for naming years.

Events 
 By place 

Roman Empire
Emperor Antoninus Pius hosts a series of grand games, to celebrate Rome's 900th anniversary.

 Asia 
 An Shigao arrives in China.

 By topic 

 Religion 
 Euzois succeeds Athendodorus, as Patriarch of Constantinople.

Births 
 Xun Yue (or Zhongyu), Chinese official and historian (d. 209)

Deaths 
 Athendodorus, Patriarch of Constantinople.

References